Altos de Arroyo Hondo is a neighbourhood in the city of Santo Domingo in the Distrito Nacional of the Dominican Republic. This neighbourhood is populated in particular by individuals from the upper middle and upper classes.

References

External links
Distrito Nacional sectors

Populated places in Santo Domingo